Single Mother (German: Ledige Mütter) is a 1928 German silent film directed by Fred Sauer and starring Victor Colani, Werner Fuetterer, and Lilian Hardt.

The film's art direction was by Willi Herrmann.

Cast
In alphabetical order
 Victor Colani 
 Werner Fuetterer 
 Lilian Hardt 
 Paul Henckels 
 Margot Landa
 Eberhard Leithoff
 Ellen Plessow 
 Lydia Potechina 
 Frida Richard 
 Margarete Schlegel
 Walter Slezak 
 Helga Thomas 
 Hermann Vallentin 
 Hertha von Walther

References

Bibliography
 Grange, William. Cultural Chronicle of the Weimar Republic. Scarecrow Press, 2008.

External links

1928 films
Films of the Weimar Republic
Films directed by Fred Sauer
German silent feature films
German black-and-white films